Shreeve is a surname. Notable people with the surname include:

Allison Shreeve (born 1982), Australian windsurfer
David Shreeve, British charity worker
David Shreeve (priest) (1934-2021), British Anglican clergyman
Fred Shreeve (1882–1962), English footballer
Jack Shreeve (1917-1966), English footballer
Jean'ne Shreeve (born 1933), American chemist
Mark Shreeve, English musician

See also
Shreeves